South American junior records in the sport of athletics are ratified by the CONSUDATLE. Athletics records comprise the best performance of an athlete before the year of their 20th birthday.  Technically, in all under 20 age divisions, the age is calculated "on December 31 of the year of competition" to avoid age group switching during a competitive season. CONSUDATLE maintains these records only in a specific list of outdoor events. All other records, including all indoor records, shown on this list are tracked by statisticians not officially sanctioned by CONSUDATLE.

Outdoor

Men
Key to tables:

A = affected by altitude

NWI = no wind information

h = hand timing

Women

Indoor

Men

Women

References
General
CONSUDATLE:South American Records 28 September 2022 updated
Specific

Junior
South American